Baranovskyi is a Ukrainian surname. Notable people with the surname include:

Artem Baranovskyi (born 1990), Ukrainian football midfielder
Leonid Baranovskyi (1953−2013), Ukrainian football midfielder

Ukrainian-language surnames